Adanır is a Turkish surname. Notable people with the surname include:

Mete Adanır (1961–1989), Turkish Cypriot footballer
Recep Adanır (1929–2017), Turkish footballer and manager

Turkish-language surnames